Jonathan Kweku Awote-Mensah (born 27 March 1992), professionally known as Jae5 is a British-Ghanaian record producer and mixing engineer from Plaistow, East London. He is a Grammy Award-winning producer and is signed to Black Butter Records.

Early life
Jonathan Mensah grew up in London as a child and moved to Ghana from age 9 to age 12 with his brothers. He is the older brother of NSG members Kruddz and OGD. When he moved back to London, he did courses at the program APE Media, where he developed production and engineering skills. His older brother also had a DJ program where he learned how to use Fruity Loops and other software tools.

Career
Jae5 was part of a production company called JOAT Music Group, started by his uncle Blemish and artist Randy Valentine. He began working with J Hus with JOAT in 2015 and produced the mixtape The 15th Day to widespread acclaim. He later began producing for other British artists such as MoStack and Dave. In 2017, he executive produced the album Common Sense by J Hus, spawning the successful single "Did You See". Following that success, he worked with Burna Boy on the songs "Sekkle Down" and "Calm Down". Also in 2018, he worked with Geko, Shakka, Mr Eazi, Rudimental, and Young T & Bugsey, as well as producing NSG's most successful single "Options". In 2019, he produced the multi platinum single "Location" and "Disaster" by Dave. His producing credits earned him accolades such as the GRM Rated Awards and MOBO Awards for Best Producer.

In 2021, Jae5 released his debut single as a lead artist called "Dimension" featuring Skepta and Rema.

Artistry
Jae5 was credited by many publications as a producer for pioneering the fusion genre of afroswing. His sound is described as a fusion between grime, afrobeats, bashment, and dancehall.

Discography

Singles

As lead artist

As featured artist

Production discography

2015
J Hus – The 15th Day
 01. "I'm Coming" (produced with JOAT Music Group)
 02. "Shawty Inda Bando" (featuring Baseman) (produced with JOAT Music Group)
 03. "Bangers & Mash" (featuring Deepee) (produced with JOAT Music Group)
 04. "Warm It Up" (produced with JOAT Music Group)
 05. "No Way" (produced with N2theA)
 06. "Dubai" (featuring Locz) (produced with JOAT Music Group)
 07. "Drive Me" (featuring Fekky) (produced with JOAT Music Group)
 08. "Forget a Hater" (featuring NSG) (produced with JOAT Music Group)
 09. "No Lie" (produced with JOAT Music Group)
 11. "Guns and Butter" (produced with JOAT Music Group)
 12. "Calling Me" (produced with JOAT Music Group)
 14. "How It Goes" (featuring Randy Valentine)	(produced with JOAT Music Group)

Mostack – So Paranoid – Single
 00. "So Paranoid"

2016
J Hus – Playing Sports
 01. "Playing Sports"
 02. "Clean It Up"
 03. "Free Up"

2017
Dave & J Hus – Samantha – Single
 00. "Samantha"

J Hus – Common Sense
 01. "Common Sense" (produced with The Compozers)
 02. "Bouff Daddy"
 03. "Clartin"
 04. "Leave Me" (produced with IO)
 05. "Closed Doors"
 06. "Did You See"
 07. "Like Your Style"
 08. "Plottin"
 09. "Sweet Cheeks" (produced with IO)
 10. "Fisherman" (featuring MoStack & MIST) (produced with Steel Banglez)
 11. "Good Time" (featuring Burna Boy)
 12. "Spirit" (produced with TSB & IO)
 13. "Mash Up" (featuring MoStack)
 14. "Goodies"
 15. "Good Luck Chale" (featuring Tiggs Da Author) (produced with Show N Prove)
 16. "Who You Are"
 17. "Friendly"

NSG – Yo Darlin''' – Single
 00. "Yo Darlin'"

French Montana – Unforgettable (J Hus Remix) – Single
 00. "Unforgettable (J Hus Remix)" (featuring J Hus & Swae Lee)

2018
Burna Boy – Outside 04. "Sekkle Down" (featuring J Hus)
 12. "Calm Down"

J Hus – Big Spang 01. "Dark Vader"
 02. "Scene"
 03. "Dancing Man"

Geko – 630 – Single
 00. "6:30" (featuring NSG)

NSG – Natural Disaster – Single
 00. "Natural Disaster"

Shakka – Tribe Tuesday – Season 2 02. "Long Ting"

Jess Glynne – Always in Between 06. "123"

Rudimental – Toast to Our Differences 04. "Walk Alone"

Mr Eazi – Life Is Eazi, Vol. 2 – Lagos to London 13. "Yard & Chill"

Young T & Bugsey – Living Gravy – Single
 00. "Living Gravy"

2019
Dave – Psychodrama 05. "Location" (featuring Burna Boy)
 06. "Disaster" (featuring J Hus) 

Mark Ronson – Late Night Feelings 06. "Don't Leave Me Lonely" (featuring Yebba) (produced with Picard Brothers, Mark Ronson, P2J, Tom Elmhirst & Brandon Bost) 

Ransom FA – Be Somebody – Single
 00. "Be Somebody"

2020
J Hus – Big Conspiracy 04. "Triumph"
 05. "Play Play" (featuring Burna Boy) (produced with Nana Rogues & Scribz Riley)
 06. "Cucumber" (produced with IO & Nana Rogues)
 07. "Repeat" (featuring Koffee)
 08. "Fortune Teller" (produced with IO, Levi Lennox & Maestro)
 11. "Must Be" 
 12. "One and Only" (featuring Ella Mai)
 13. "Love, Peace and Prosperity"
 14. "Deeper Than Rap" (produced with IO)

Dyo – Dyologue 01. "Real"

NSG – ROOTS 04. "Nonsense" (featuring Chip)
 07. "Zantoni"
 14. "Ourself"
 18. "Options" (featuring Tion Wayne)

Burna Boy – Twice as Tall 15. "Bank On It"

Young T & Bugsey – Plead the 5th 03. "Madonna"
 04. "Don't Rush" (featuring Headie One) 

2021
Octavian – ALPHA 05. "Famous" (featuring Gunna & Saint Jhn)

JAE5 - Dimension – Single
 00. "Dimension" (featuring Skepta & Rema)

Dave – We're All Alone in This Together 06. "System" (featuring Wizkid) (produced with Kyle Evans, P2J & Joe Reeves)
 07. "Lazarus" (featuring Boj) (produced with P2J & Joe Reeves)
 08. "Law of Attraction" (featuring Snoh Aalegra)

Skepta – All In 03. "Nirvana" (with J Balvin)
 04. "Lit Like This"

Not3s – 3 Th3 Album 03. "3rd Eye"

Headie One – Too Loyal for my Own Good 07. "Finer Things"

NSG – Petite – Single
 00. "Petite"

NSG – Headliner 02. "Suzanna" (featuring Patoranking)

2022
Koffee – Gifted 03. "Shine"
 09. "Pull Up"

King Promise – 5 Star 08. "Ginger"

M Huncho – Chasing Euphoria 08. "Pray 2 The East" (featuring BNXN fka Buju) (produced with Emmanuel Asamoah & Nana Pokes)

Burna Boy - Love, Damini 09. "It's Plenty"

JAE5 - Propeller – Single
 00. "Propeller" (featuring Dave & Bnxn)

Blaqbonez - Young Preacher''
 05. "Back in Uni"

Awards and nominations

References 

1992 births
Living people
People from Plaistow, Newham
British people of Ghanaian descent
21st-century Ghanaian musicians
British record producers
Ghanaian songwriters
Ghanaian record producers